Zuger Kantonalbank is a cantonal bank based in Switzerland. Its head office is situated at Zug, Switzerland. Founded in 1892, Zuger Kantonalbank is a universal bank, providing retail and corporate banking products mainly to the canton residents. The bank has full state guarantee of its liabilities.

See also
Cantonal bank
List of banks
List of banks in Switzerland

References

External links
 Official website

Cantonal banks
Companies listed on the SIX Swiss Exchange
Banks established in 1892
Swiss companies established in 1892